The Marlborough green gecko, also known as the manuka gecko,(Naultinus manukanus) is a small species of gecko endemic to New Zealand. It grows to a maximum of 70mm, and is green, with some individuals displaying gold markings. The underside of the gecko is a lighter green in females, and silvery in males. The holotype is in the collection of the Museum of New Zealand Te Papa Tongarewa.

Conservation status 
In 2012 the Department of Conservation classified the Marlborough gecko as At Risk under the New Zealand Threat Classification System. It was judged as meeting the criteria for At Risk threat status as a result of it having a low to high ongoing or predicted decline. This gecko is also regarded as being Conservation Dependent.

References

External links
 New Zealand Herpetological Society Page on Marlborough gecko

Naultinus
Reptiles of New Zealand
Endemic fauna of New Zealand
Reptiles described in 1955
Taxa named by Charles McCann
Endemic reptiles of New Zealand